North Street station is a SEPTA Route 102 trolley stop in Collingdale, Pennsylvania. It is located at Woodlawn Avenue and North Street.

Trolleys arriving at this station travel between 69th Street Terminal in Upper Darby, Pennsylvania and Sharon Hill, Pennsylvania. The station has a shed with a roof where people can go inside when it is raining. This shed is located between the tracks and Girard Avenue. North Street is where the Route 102 line leaves Woodlawn Avenue itself and runs along a separate right-of-way along the east side of the street. It is also the station where the second track ends along the Sharon Hill line. 

In the summer of 2021, the outbound track was extended to just south of the station and a new outbound platform. This was added so that Sharon Hill trolleys no longer have to wait for 69th Street trolleys to exit the station as the single track formerly ended just before entering the station platform. The former switch prior to the station was moved a half block south and the new outbound track extension ends a half block further onward at a bumper, allowing for trolley storage if necessary.

Station layout

External links

 Station from Spruce Street from Google Maps Street View

SEPTA Media–Sharon Hill Line stations